KB Lager, named after the 'Kent Brewery', was once one of the most popular beers in NSW. It was popularised amongst a younger demographic by the fictional beer-swilling rugby league legend Reg Reagan as his beer of choice.

KB sponsored rugby league tournament KB Cup (1982–83)

See also

Australian pub
Beer in Australia
List of breweries in Australia

References

Australian beer brands